The provinces of Thailand are part of the government of Thailand that is divided into 76 provinces proper and one special administrative area, representing the capital Bangkok. They are the primary local government units and act as juristic persons. They are divided into amphoe (districts) which are further divided into tambon (sub districts), the next lower level of local government. Each province is led by a governor (ผู้ว่าราชการจังหวัด phu wa ratchakan changwat), who is appointed by the central government.

The provinces and administrative areas 

 The total population of Thailand is 67,592,000 as of December 2022.
 The total land area of Thailand is 517,646 km2 in 2013.
 HS – Harmonized Commodity Description and Coding System.
 FIPS code is replaced on 31 December 2014 with ISO 3166.

Governance

Thailand's national government organisation is divided into three types: central government (ministries, bureaus and departments), provincial government (provinces and districts) and local government (Bangkok, Pattaya, provincial administrative organisations, etc.).

A province, as part of the provincial government, is administered by a governor (ผู้ว่าราชการจังหวัด) who is appointed by the Minister of Interior. Bangkok, as part of the local government, is administered by a corporation called Bangkok Metropolitan Administration. The corporation is led by the Governor of Bangkok (ผู้ว่าราชการกรุงเทพมหานคร) who is directly elected by the citizens of Bangkok.

The provinces are named by their original main city, which is not necessarily still the most populous city within the province today. Also, in several provinces the administration has been moved into a new building outside the city.

History

Before 1892
Many provinces date back to semi-independent local chiefdoms or kingdoms, which made up the Ayutthaya Kingdom. The provinces were created around a capital city (mueang), and included surrounding villages or satellite towns. The provinces were administered either by a governor, who was appointed by the king or by a local ruling family, who were descendants of the old kings and princes of that area and had been given this privilege by the central king. De facto the king did not have much choice but to choose someone from the local nobility or an economically strong man, as against these local power groups the administration would have become impossible. The governor was not paid by the king, but instead financed himself and his administration by imposing local taxes himself. Every province was required to send an annual tribute to Bangkok.

The provinces were divided into four different classes. The first-class were the border provinces. The second-class were those that once had their own princely house. Third-class were provinces that were created by splitting them from other provinces. Fourth-class were provinces near the capital. Additionally tributary states like the principalities of Lan Na, the Laotian kingdoms of Vientiane and Luang Prabang, Cambodia, or the Malay sultanate Kedah were also part of the country, but with more autonomy than the provinces. In this Mandala system the semi-independent countries sometimes were tributary to more than one country.

New provinces were created when the population of an area outgrew the administration, but also for political reasons. If a governor became too dominant in a region former satellite cities were elevated to provincial status, as was the case with Maha Sarakham province.

Reforms of the provincial administration started in the 1870s under increased pressure from the colonial states of the United Kingdom and France. Agents were sent, especially to border areas, to impose more control on the provinces or tributary states.

Administrative reform of 1892

At the end of the 19th century King Chulalongkorn reformed the central government. In 1892 the ministry, which previously had many overlapping responsibilities, was reorganized with clear missions as in Western administrations. Prince Damrong Rajanubhab became minister of the Ministry of the North (Mahatthai), originally responsible for the northern administration. When the Ministry of the South (Kalahom) was dissolved in 1894, Prince Damrong became Minister of the Interior, responsible for the provincial administration of the whole country.

Starting in 1893 the already existing commissionaireships in some parts of the country were renamed "superintendent commissioner" (khaluang Thesaphiban), and their area of responsibility was called a monthon. In strategically important areas the monthon were created first, while in other areas the provinces kept their independence a bit longer. Several smaller provinces were reduced in status to an amphoe (district) or even lower to a tambon (sub-district) and included in a neighboring province, sometimes for administrative reasons, but sometimes to remove an uncooperative governor.

In some regions rebellions broke out against the new administrative system, usually induced by the local nobility fearing their loss of power. The most notable was the Holy Man Rebellion in 1902 in Isan. It was initially a messianic doomsday sect, but it also attacked government representatives in the northeast. The provincial town Khemarat was even burned by the rebels. After a few months the rebellion was beaten back.

After 1916, the word changwat became common to use for the provinces, partly to distinguish them from the provincial capital city (mueang or amphoe mueang), but also to stress the new administrative structure of the provinces.

When Prince Damrong resigned in 1915, the whole country was divided into 19 monthon (including the area around Bangkok, which was under the responsibility of another ministry until 1922), with 72 provinces.

In December 1915 King Vajiravudh announced the creation of regions (phak), each administered by a viceroy (upparat), to cover several monthon. Until 1922 four regions were established, however in 1925 they were dissolved again. At the same time several monthon were merged, in an attempt to streamline administration and reduce costs.

Since 1932
The monthons were dissolved when Thailand transformed from an absolute monarchy into a constitutional monarchy in 1932, making the provinces the top level administrative division again. Several smaller provinces were also abolished at that time. During World War II, several provinces around Bangkok were merged. These changes were undone after the war. Also the occupied area from French Indochina was organized into four provinces: Phra Tabong, Phibunsongkhram, Nakhon Champasak and Lan Chang. The current province of Sukhothai was at first known as Sawankhalok.  It was renamed Sukhothai in 1939 (which is why the railway system goes to Sawankhalok city and not Sukhothai city). The province, Kalasin, was reestablished in 1947 after having been dissolved in 1932.

In 1972 Phra Nakhon and Thonburi provinces were merged to form the special administrative area of Bangkok, which combines the tasks of the provinces with that of a municipality, including having an elected governor.

Starting in the second half of the 20th century some provinces were newly created by splitting them off from bigger provinces. In 1975, Yasothon province was split off from Ubon Ratchathani. In 1977, Phayao province was created from districts formerly part of Chiang Rai. In 1982, Mukdahan was split off from Nakhon Phanom. In 1993 three provinces were created: Sa Kaeo (split from Prachinburi), Nong Bua Lamphu province (split from Udon Thani), and Amnat Charoen (split from Ubon Ratchathani). The newest province is Bueng Kan, which was split off from Nong Khai effective 23 March 2011.

Former provinces and administrative areas

Former Provinces Merged into Other Provinces

Lost Territories

Map of Siam in early 1893 showing provinces

Historic Administrative Division of Thailand

See also
 ISO 3166-2:TH
 List of districts of Thailand
 List of Thai provinces by GPP
 Nationality, religion, and language data for the provinces of Thailand
 Organization of the government of Thailand
 Seals of the provinces of Thailand

References

Further reading

External links

 Department of Provincial Administration
 Pronunciation of provinces in Thailand at www.forvo.com

 
Subdivisions of Thailand
Thailand geography-related lists
Thailand 1
Provinces, Thailand
Thailand, provinces by area
Thailand
Geography of Thailand